Alejandro Martínez Chorro (born 28 May 1998) is a Spanish track cyclist, who competes in sprinting events. He won the bronze medal in the 1 km time trial at the 2022 UCI Track Cycling World Championships. He simultaneously set the Spanish record in the event in a time of 59.871 seconds, making him the first Spanish rider to break 1 minute.

References

External links

1998 births
Living people
Spanish male cyclists
Spanish track cyclists
European Games competitors for Spain
Cyclists at the 2019 European Games
21st-century Spanish people